Alapaʻi (died 1754) was a Chief of Hawaiʻi.

Alapai may also refer to:

Julia Alapai (c. 1814–1849), high chiefess of the Kingdom of Hawaii and granddaughter of Alapaʻi
Alapai Wahine (late 18th–early 19th century), princess of the Island of Hawaii
Nani Alapai (1874–1928), Hawaiian soprano singer